Divine Shepherdess or Divina Pastora is a title which refers to Mary, mother of Jesus, in connection with Jesus's role as the "Good Shepherd". This title may refer to:

 Cathedral of the Divine Shepherdess, seat of the Apostolic Vicariate of Tucupita, Venezuela
 Daughters of the Divine Shepherdess, a religious order founded by Manuel Míguez González
 Divina Pastora, a municipality in Brazil
 Divina Pastora (Barquisimeto), a statue in Barquisimeto, Venezuela
 National Shrine of Virgen La Divina Pastora, a church in the Philippines
 A church and statue in Siparia, Trinidad
 A festival in Cojedes, Venezuela

See also 
 Our Lady of the Good Shepherd (disambiguation)